Sea to Sea: Filled With Your Glory is the first release in the annual Sea to Sea praise and worship music series.  The album comprises thirty Christian worship songs on two CDs performed by Canadian artists.  It won a Gospel Music Association Canada Covenant Award in 2005 for Special Events/Compilation Album of the Year. The Sea to Sea series was the brainchild of Executive Producer Martin Smith.

Track listing

Disc 1 

The Cry - bevAcqua
Every Move I Make - David Ruis
God Is An Awesome God - Pat Francis & High Praise
Jesus My Glory - Steve Bell
Amazing - Curtis Mulder
He Is Yahweh - Dean Salyn
God Is Our Refuge - Northview Community Church
Renew In Me - Aileen Lombardo
Ocean - Ten Shekel Shirt
Great "I Am" - Laurell Hubick
Today - Brian Doerksen
What A Faithful God - Robert Critchley
Fall On Me - Ron Wilding
Thank You - Greg Sczebel
If My People - The Penny Merchants
Sing, Shout, Clap - Billy Funk
Dieu Est Un Refuge - Northview Community Church

Disc 2 

Filled With Your Glory - Starfield
Show Me Your Mercy - Craig Douglas Band
Sing Hallelujah - Mark Stokes
Come And Fill Me Up - The Revolution Band
Worthy - Fergus Marsh
All You Are - Dan Wilt
Right Now - Tehillah Toronto
Holy One - Three Season Ant
Sing To The Lord - Q-Town
Lord Of Everything - Jon Buller
People On Our Knees - Ken And Tracy Rahn
Instrument Of Praise - Toronto Mass Choir
You Are All I Need - Sean Dayton
How Is It - Chris Janzen
The Peace Of Christ - Glen Soderholm

References 

Contemporary Christian music albums by Canadian artists
2004 compilation albums